Don Dietrich is the name of:

Don Dietrich (musician), saxophonist
Don Dietrich (ice hockey) (born 1961), professional ice hockey player